Mah e Mir is a 2016 Pakistani biographical film directed by Anjum Shahzad, produced by Khurram Rana, Sahir Rasheed, Badar Ikram and written by Sarmad Sehbai. The film is based on the life of the famous poet Mir Taqi Mir, role played by Fahad Mustafa. Film also stars Iman Ali, Sanam Saeed, Alyy Khan and Manzar Sehbai in lead roles. It was the official submission by the Pakistani Academy Selection Committee as the country's entry for the Best Foreign Language Film at the 89th Academy Awards but it was not nominated.

Mah-e-Mir  is a story that follows the struggle of a contemporary poet and draws parallels with events in Mir's life. The film was co-distributed by Hum Films and Eveready Pictures on 6 May 2016 nationwide.

Plot
The film's story focuses on the life of a modern-day poet named Jamal (Fahad Mustafa) going through a rough patch. The movie tries to draw parallels between Jamal's and Mir Taqi Mir's life with the story jumping from present day to Jamal's mind as he imagines himself to be Mir Taqi Mir in Lucknow focusing on the trials and tribulations that Mir once experienced (faithfully adapted from Mir's biography).

Cast 
The film cast includes:
 Fahad Mustafa as Ahmad Jamal/Mir Taqi Mir
 Iman Ali as Mysterious girl/Mahtab Bai
 Sanam Saeed as Naina Kanwal
 Manzar Sehbai as Dr. Kaleem
 Huma Nawab as Kaleem's ex-wife
 Alyy Khan as Nawab Sahab
 Paras Masroor as Siraj 
 Syed Fazal Hussain as Karam Elahi
 Rashid Farooqui as Nawaz

Music
The music album launch ceremony was held in Dubai on 14 April 2016. The first song promo namely Us ka Kharam Dekh Kar was released the very next day. The second song Jaag Musafir was launched on 28 April at Beaconhouse National University followed by next song Ye Dhoan Sa was released on SoundCloud on 2 May.

Production

Marketing 
The teaser trailer of film was released on 9 May 2014. On 23 March, first look poster of film was revealed followed by theatrical trailer the same night. The MaheMir team ran a decent promotional campaign visiting several institutes including Iqra University, Indus University and shows which includes Jeeto Pakistan, Morning Show Sitaray Ki Subah, Jago Pakistan Jago

Release
Earlier, the film was scheduled to release on 6 November 2015 but it was postponed and was released on 5 May 2016 in U.A.E and in Pakistan on 6 May. The film was premiered in Karachi. It was given a Universal (U) rating by the Central Board of Film Censors (CBFC).

Reception

Box office
According to BOD's prediction film might not have good business prior to film's big cast, as it was releasing opposite to Captain America: Civil War the same weekend.

Critical response
The film received huge praise for its creativity as The Express Tribune described it as "once in a blue moon film".

The film received good reviews from critics. Rafay Mahmood of The Express Tribune rated film 4/5 stars and verdicts "Watch the film with your friends and family. It is worth your money and initiates a constructive discourse".

Mehreen Hasan of Dawn Images gave the film 4/5 stars and describes the film as "a rather prescient work that anticipates its every challenge in the box office, yet refuses to pander to what sells".

Awards
Mah-e-Mir was awarded the Best Narrative Film Award at the Guam International Film Festival in 2016.

See also
 List of Pakistani films of 2016
 List of submissions to the 89th Academy Awards for Best Foreign Language Film
 List of Pakistani submissions for the Academy Award for Best Foreign Language Film

References

External links 

Pakistani romantic drama films
2010s Urdu-language films
Pakistani biographical drama films
Biographical films about writers
2016 films
2016 biographical drama films
Hum films
2016 drama films
Films set in the Mughal Empire
Films about poets